John T. and Lillian Heard House, also known as Heard Memorial Club House, is a historic home and clubhouse located at Sedalia, Pettis County, Missouri.  It was built in 1906, and is a two-story, Classical Revival style buff brick dwelling on a raised basement.  It has a hipped roof with dormers and a partial width porch with square brick and Classical wood columns.  It was built as the residence of Senator and Mrs. John T. Heard, later given by Mrs. Heard in 1935 to the Sorosis Club and the Helen G. Steele Music Clubs.

It was listed on the National Register of Historic Places in 2011.

References

Clubhouses on the National Register of Historic Places in Missouri
Houses on the National Register of Historic Places in Missouri
Neoclassical architecture in Missouri
Houses completed in 1906
Buildings and structures in Pettis County, Missouri
National Register of Historic Places in Pettis County, Missouri
1906 establishments in Missouri